Alan Rapley (born 20 April 1970) is a British swimmer. He competed in the men's 4 × 100 metre freestyle relay event at the 1996 Summer Olympics.

References

External links
 

1970 births
Living people
British male swimmers
Olympic swimmers of Great Britain
Swimmers at the 1996 Summer Olympics
People from Epping
British male freestyle swimmers
20th-century British people